The Price to Play is the debut album from Alan Price & The Alan Price Set, released in 1966. It was released in the UK only, although some tracks would later come out in the US. Fronting a six-piece band that includes three horns, Price sticks mostly to covers of familiar American rhythm and blues and soul tunes.

Track listing
 "Medley: Barefootin' / Let's Go Baby (Where the Action Is) / Land of 1000 Dances"  (Robert Parker/Chris Kenner) – 4:36
"Just Once in My Life"  (Gerry Goffin, Carole King, Phil Spector) – 3:26	
 "Goin' Down Slow"   (St. Louis Jimmy) – 4:45
 "Getting Mighty Crowded" (Van McCoy) – 2:15	
 "Honky Tonk"  	(Billy Butler, Bill Doggett, Clifford Scott, Shep Shepherd) – 4:40
 "Move On Drifter" (Jeanette Washington) – 2:29	
 "Mercy, Mercy"  (Don Covay) – 3:09	
 "Loving You Is Sweeter Than Ever"  (Ivy Jo Hunter, Stevie Wonder) – 2:46	
 "Ain't That Peculiar"  (Pete Moore, William "Smokey" Robinson, Bobby Rogers, Marv Tarplin) – 3:22	
 "I Can't Turn You Loose"  (Otis Redding) – 2:24
 "Critic's Choice" (Oliver Nelson) – 2:02	
 "Hi-Lili, Hi-Lo"  (Helen Deutsch, Bronisław Kaper) – 2:49

Personnel
 Alan Price – keyboards, vocals

The Alan Price Set
 Clive Burrows – saxophone
 Steve Gregory – saxophone
 John Walters – trumpet 
 Pete Kirtley – guitar
 Rod "Boots" Slade – bass 
 "Little" Roy Mills – drums

Technical
 Chris Walter – photography
 Eric Burdon – liner notes

References

1966 debut albums
Alan Price albums
Decca Records albums